Club Deportivo Atlético San José  is a Salvadoran professional football club based in La Palma, El Salvador.

History
In summer 2010, Atlético San José became the first team from La Palma in history to play in the Salvadoran Third Division.

Coaches
 Ignacio Cartagena

External links
 Atlético San José jugará en tercera división - Diario CoLatino 

Football clubs in El Salvador